Global Underground 036: Bogotá is a DJ mix album in the Global Underground series, compiled and mixed by DJ and producer Darren Emerson.  The entry is Emerson's third in the Global Underground series.

Track listing

References

External links 

Global Underground
2009 compilation albums